Kraemer House may refer to:
Kraemer House (Prairieville, Louisiana), listed on the NRHP in Louisiana
Samuel Kraemer Building, in Anaheim, California, listed on the NRHP in Orange County, California
Kraemer-Harman House, Hot Springs, Arkansas, listed on the NRHP in Arkansas